Claude-Jacques Herbert (1700 – 1758) was a French economist.

Works

References 

1700 births
1758 deaths
Agricultural economists
French economists